Shap Pat Heung is an area in the New Territories of Hong Kong. Located south of Yuen Long and northeast of Tai Tong, the area occupies the plain north of hills of Tai Lam. The Cantonese name 'Shap Pat Heung' means 'eighteen villages' at its beginning. It was later expanded to thirty villages. Administratively, it is part of the Yuen Long District.

The area is famous for the celebration of Tin Hau Festival on the 23rd day of the 3rd month every year of Chinese calendar. Parade and Fa Pao attracts many visitors and pilgrims from other villages and towns.

List of villages
 Tai Tong Tsuen
 Shan Pui Tsuen
 Tai Wai Tsuen (Yuen Long Kau Hui)
 Ha Yau Tin Tsuen
 Sheung Yau Tin Tsuen
 Tai Kiu Tsuen
 Muk Kiu Tau Tsuen
 Shui Tsiu Lo Wai
 Shui Tsiu San Tsuen
 Nga Yiu Tau Tsuen
 Pak Sha Tsuen
 Tin Liu Tsuen
 Sai Pin Wai (Yuen Long Kau Hui)
 Tung Tau Tsuen (Yuen Long Kau Hui)
 Nam Pin Wai (Yuen Long Kau Hui)
 Nam Hang Tsuen
 Ying Lung Wai (Yuen Long Kau Hui)
 Hung Tso Tin Tsuen
 Ma Tin Tsuen
 Sham Chung Tsuen
 Wong Uk Tsuen (Yuen Long Kau Hui)
 Wong Nai Tun Tsuen
 Kong Tau Tsuen
 Tong Tau Po Tsuen
 Yeung Uk Tsuen
 Tsoi Uk Tsuen or Choi Uk Tsuen (Yuen Long Kau Hui)
 Tai Kei Leng
 Shan Pui Chung Hau Tsuen
 Shung Ching San Tsuen
 Lung Tin Tsuen

Education
Shap Pat Heung is in Primary One Admission (POA) School Net 74. Within the school net are multiple aided schools (operated independently but funded with government money) and one government school: Yuen Long Government Primary School (元朗官立小學).

References

 
Yuen Long District
Places in Hong Kong